Nick Hanson (born 21 September 1973) is a former Australian rules footballer who played for St Kilda in the Australian Football League (AFL) in 1993. He was recruited from the Sandringham Football Club in the Victorian Football Association (VFA) with the 76th selection in the 1993 Pre-season Draft.

References

External links

Living people
1973 births
St Kilda Football Club players
Sandringham Football Club players
Australian rules footballers from Victoria (Australia)